Bakir (meaning "coming early") or Bakır (Turkish, meaning "copper") may refer to:

Given name
 Bakir Beširević (born 1965), Bosnian footballer
 Bakır Çağlar (1941–2011), Turkish jurist and professor of constitutional law
 Bakir Izetbegović (born 1956), Bosnian politician
 Mohamed Bakir El-Nakib (born 1974), Egyptian handball player

Surname
 Aziz Osman Bakir
 Feride Bakır (born 1992), Turkish-German women's footballer
 Pelin Gündeş Bakır (born 1972), Turkish academic and politician
 Remziye Bakır (born 1997), Turkish women's footballer
 Ron Bakir (born 1977), Lebanese-Australian entrepreneur
 Tursunbai Bakir Uulu (born 1958), Kyrgyz politician

Places
 Bakır, Manisa, a village in the Manisa Province of Turkey

See also
 Avul Pakir Jainulabdeen Abdul Kalam (1931 – 2015), 11th President of India

Arabic-language surnames
Arabic masculine given names